The 1952 United States Senate election in Wyoming took place November 4, 1952. Incumbent Democratic Senator Joseph C. O'Mahoney ran for his fourth consecutive term. He faced a strong challenge from Republican Governor Frank A. Barrett, and faced difficult headwinds as Dwight D. Eisenhower, the Republican nominee for president, was winning Wyoming in a landslide over Democratic nominee Adlai Stevenson. Despite his history of strong performances in the increasingly conservative state, however, O'Mahoney was unable to replicate it, and narrowly lost to Barrett. However, O'Mahoney would return to the Senate less than two years later; following the death of Senator Lester C. Hunt, he was elected to the Senate once again in the 1954 election.

Democratic primary

Candidates
 Joseph C. O'Mahoney, incumbent U.S. Senator

Results

Republican Primary

Candidates
 Frank A. Barrett, incumbent Governor of Wyoming

Results

General election

Results

References

United States Senate elections in Wyoming
Wyoming
United States Senate